Jubilee is an American electronic musician.

Early career
Jubilee began DJing as part of the underground rave scene in Miami, Florida. She moved to New York City in 2003. She primarily plays Miami bass-inspired club music, incorporating 2-step, dubstep, house, and grime into her DJ sets. In 2008, she began working with Jason Forrest on a label named Nightshifters and threw a series of parties with Nick Catchdubs and DJ Ayres named Flashing Lights. She also collaborated with fellow DJ/producers Udachi and Star Eyes (with whom she released the tracks "Locked" and "Merkwood Estates" on Unknown to the Unknown). After shutting down Nightshifters, she began collaborating with Mixpak, which released her EPs Pull Ova, Pop It!, and Jealous. Pop It! was reviewed in Spin in 2012.

Current career
In 2016, Jubilee joined Mixpak artists Popcaan, Spice, and Dre Skull for Mixpak's debut appearance at Red Bull's Culture Clash. They won the contest.

Also in 2016, Jubilee released her debut album, After Hours, on Mixpak. The album received favorable reviews from Pitchfork, Fader, and Fact Magazine. She was named as one of Brooklyn Magazine's "Brooklyn 100". That same year, Pitchfork named After Hours one of the top electronic music albums of 2016. This was followed up in 2019 with a sophomore record entitled Call for Location, featuring collaborations with P Money and Maluca.

Jubilee currently heads the record label Magic City.

Discography
 Pop It! EP, Mixpak, 2012
Keys Phone Wallet EP, with Burt Fox, Trouble & Bass, 2013 (re-released on Magic City, 2022)
 Pull Ova EP, Mixpak, 2014
 Jealous EP, Mixpak, 2015
 After Hours, Mixpak, 2016
 Call for Location, Mixpak, 2019
Are We There Yet? EP, Magic City, 2020
Don't Play This EP, Magic City, 2021
Sunscreen EP, Magic City, 2022

References

Year of birth missing (living people)
Living people
American women in electronic music
American women DJs
Musicians from New York City
Musicians from Miami
21st-century American women